False Cape State Park is a  state park located on the Currituck Banks Peninsula, a  barrier spit between the Back Bay of the Currituck Sound and the Atlantic Ocean, within the city of Virginia Beach, adjacent to the state border with North Carolina, and just north of Mackay Island National Wildlife Refuge.

False Cape State Park includes hiking and biking trails, a visitors' center, environmental educational and primitive camping facilities. The park can be accessed from the north on foot, bicycle, or seasonally available tram through Back Bay National Wildlife Refuge, or from the south on foot or bicycle. Boat access is possible from any shoreline. Limited beach vehicular access remains for grandfathered permit holders.

History
Ships and boats looking for Cape Henry instead sailed into the shallow waters, where they could easily run aground.

The community of Wash Woods, now abandoned, was developed by survivors of such a shipwreck in the 17th or early 18th century. The village's church and other structures were built using cypress wood that washed ashore from a wreck. In the early 20th century, False Cape was a haven for a number of hunt clubs taking advantage of the area's abundant waterfowl. The park's Wash Woods Environmental Education Center is a converted hunt clubhouse.

Undeveloped portions of the park were dedicated as the False Cape Natural Area Preserve in 2002.

At the south end of False Cape is a monument with "Va." on one side and "N Ca" on the other. Although it reads "A.D. 1728" on the top, it was more likely erected in 1887 when the boundary was surveyed again, since the original marker was a simple cedar post.  "A.D. 1728" refers to the year the current boundary was first surveyed.

See also
 Wash Woods
 Virginia Beach, Virginia
 Back Bay National Wildlife Refuge
 Former counties, cities, and towns of Virginia

References

External links

 False Cape State Park
 Waterland Farm website with photos of remains of Wash Woods
 Museumsusa.org, False Cape State Park webpage
 VirginiaBeach.com

State parks of Virginia
Wetlands of Virginia
Parks in Virginia Beach, Virginia
Nature centers in Virginia
Landforms of Virginia Beach, Virginia